General Dynamics Electric Boat (GDEB) is a subsidiary of General Dynamics Corporation. It has been the primary builder of submarines for the United States Navy for more than 100 years. The company's main facilities are a shipyard in Groton, Connecticut, a hull-fabrication and outfitting facility in Quonset Point, Rhode Island, and a design and engineering facility in New London, Connecticut.

History
The company was founded in 1899 by Isaac Rice as the Electric Boat Company to build John Philip Holland's submersible ship designs, which were developed at Lewis Nixon's Crescent Shipyard in Elizabeth, New Jersey.  Holland VI was the first submarine that this shipyard built, which became  when it was commissioned into the United States Navy on April 11, 1900—the first submarine to be officially commissioned. The success of Holland VI created a demand for follow-up models (A class or ) that began with the prototype submersible Fulton built at Electric Boat. Some foreign navies were interested in John Holland's latest submarine designs, and so purchased the rights to build them under licensing contracts through the company; these included the United Kingdom's Royal Navy, the Imperial Japanese Navy, the Imperial Russian Navy, and the Royal Netherlands Navy.

From 1907 to 1925 Electric Boat designed submarines for the Navy and subcontracted their construction to the Fore River Shipyard in Quincy, Massachusetts and other shipyards. During this era, the company designed submarines of the B, C, D, E, K, L, M, N, AA-1, O, R, and S classes.

During the World War I era, the company and its subsidiaries (notably the Electric Launch Company, or Elco) built 85 submarines via subcontractors and 722 submarine chasers for the US Navy, and 580 80-foot motor launches for the British Royal Navy.

Interwar
After the war, the US Navy did not order another submarine from Electric Boat until  in 1931.  Cuttlefish was the first submarine built at EB's plant in Groton, Connecticut which has ever since been its primary submarine manufacturing facility.  EB was the lead yard for several classes of submarines (Perch, Salmon, Sargo, Tambor, Gar, Mackerel and Gato) prior to World War II.

Starting in the early 1930s, EB was one of only two major US submarine manufacturers (the other being the Portsmouth Navy Yard) until the late 1950s. Three other yards (Manitowoc, Mare Island, and Cramp) produced submarines only during World War II. Several other yards including Mare Island built submarines in the late 1950s through the early 1970s. Since that time, only Electric Boat and Newport News have built submarines for the US Navy.

World War II
During World War II, the company built 74 submarines, while Elco built nearly 400 PT boats, and Electric Boat ranked 77th among United States corporations in the value of World War II military production contracts.

Post war
In 1952, Electric Boat was reorganized as General Dynamics Corporation under John Jay Hopkins. General Dynamics acquired Convair the following year, and the holding company assumed the "General Dynamics" name while the submarine-building operation reverted to the "Electric Boat" name.

Electric Boat built the first nuclear submarine  which was launched in January 1954, and the first ballistic missile submarine  in 1959. In 2002, EB conducted preservation work on Nautilus, preparing her for her berth at the US Navy Submarine Force Library and Museum in Groton, Connecticut where she now resides as a museum. Electric Boat's first submarine Holland was scrapped in 1932.

From the mid-1970s to the present, EB has been one of only two submarine manufacturers in the United States with the other being Newport News Shipbuilding in Virginia.

Electric Boat overhauls and undertakes repair work on fast attack class boats. The company built the Ohio-class ballistic missile submarines and Seawolf-class submarines, as well as others. In April 2014, EB was awarded a $17.8 billion contract with Naval Sea Systems Command for ten Block IV Virginia-class attack submarines. It is the largest single shipbuilding contract in the service's history. The company builds the submarine along with Huntington Ingalls Industries Newport News Shipbuilding. The boats of Block IV Virginias will cost less than Block III, as Electric Boat reduced the cost of the submarines by increasing efficiency in the construction process. The submarines of this type will build on the improvements to allow the boats to spend less time in the yard.  In 2019 EB received a contract with Naval Sea Systems command to begin procuring materials for the Block V variant of the Virginia-Class. This upgrade brings the Virginia payload module, which enables Tomahawk missiles to be carried by the submarine.

1980s structural welding defect cover up 
In the early 1980s, structural welding defects had been covered up by falsified inspection records, and this led to significant delays and expenses in the delivery of several submarines being built at Electric Boat's shipyard. In some cases, the repairs resulted in practically dismantling and then rebuilding what had been a nearly completed submarine. The yard tried to pass the vast cost overruns directly on to the Navy, while Admiral Hyman G. Rickover demanded from Electric Boat's general manager P. Takis Veliotis that the yard make good on its "shoddy" workmanship.

The Navy eventually settled with General Dynamics in 1981, paying out $634 million of $843 million in Los Angeles-class submarines cost-overrun and reconstruction claims. As it happened, the Navy was also the yard's insurer, liable to compensate the company for losses and other mishaps. The concept of reimbursing General Dynamics under these conditions was initially considered "preposterous," in the words of Secretary of the Navy John Lehman, but the eventual legal basis of General Dynamics' reimbursement claims to the Navy for the company's poor workmanship included insurance compensation. Veliotis was subsequently indicted by a federal grand jury under racketeering and fraud charges in 1983 for demanding $1.3 million in kickbacks from a subcontractor. He escaped into exile and a life of luxury in his native Greece, where he remained a fugitive from U.S. justice.

Ships built 
This list does not include submarines built by other companies under contract to Electric Boat.

Cachalot class

EB built 1 of 2 total in the class

Porpoise class 

5 of 10 total in class

Salmon class

3 of 6 total in class

Sargo class

5 of 10 total in class

Tambor class

6 of 12 total in class, all diesel-electric

'Mackerel class

1 of 2 total in classGato class

41 of 77 total in class, all diesel-electricBalao class

40 of 120 total in class, all diesel-electricTench class

1 of 29 total in classBarracuda class

1 of 3 total in classTang class

3 of 6 total in classNautilus class

Unique submarineT-1 class

1 of 2 total in classDarter class

Unique submarineSeawolf class

Unique submarineSkate class

1 of 4 total in classSkipjack class

2 of 6 total in classTriton class

Unique submarineThresher/Permit class

3 of 14 total in classTullibee class

Unique submarineGeorge Washington class

2 of 5 total in classEthan Allen class

2 of 5 total in classLafayette class

4 of 9 total in classJames Madison class

3 of 10 total in classSturgeon class

11 of 37 total in classBenjamin Franklin class

6 of 12 total in classNarwhal class

Unique submarineGlenard P. Lipscomb class

Unique submarineLos Angeles class

33 of 62 total in classOhio class

18 of 18 total in classSeawolf class

3 of 3 total in classVirginia classColumbia class

References

 Gardiner, Robert, Conway's All the World's Fighting Ships 1906–1921 Conway Maritime Press, 1985. .

Further reading
 The Defender The Story of General Dynamics, by Roger Franklin. Published by Harper and Row 1986.
 Brotherhood of Arms: General Dynamics and The Business of Defending America, by Jacob Goodwin. Published 1985. Random House.
 The Legend of Electric Boat, Serving The Silent Service. Published by Write Stuff Syndicate, 1994 and 2007. Written by Jeffery L. Rodengen.
 International Directory of Company Histories  Volume 86 under General Dynamics/Electric Boat Corporation, July 2007; pp. 136–139. Published by St James Press/Thomson Gale Group.
 Who Built Those Subs? Naval History Magazine, Oct. 1998 125th Anniversary issue, pp. 31–34. Written by Richard Knowles Morris PhD. Published by The United States Naval Institute, Annapolis, Md. Copyrighted 1998.The Klaxon, The U.S. Navy's official submarine force newsletter, April 1992. Published by the Nautilus Memorial Submarine Force Library and Museum in Groton/New London, CT.
 "The Ups and Downs of Electric Boat" John D. Alden, United States Naval Institute, Proceedings Magazine, 1 July 1999, p. 64.
 Running Critical: The Silent War, Rickover, and General Dynamics'', by Patrick Tyler. Published by Harper & Row 1986.

See also
 Electric Launch Company (Elco) - former subsidiary which manufactured electric yachts, and PT boats during World War II
 Electro-Dynamic Company - former subsidiary of Electric Boat which manufactured electric motors and generators
 Submarine Boat Company - former subsidiary of Electric Boat which ran a shipyard during WWI producing steel cargo vessels, and slightly beyond

External links

 General Dynamics Electric Boat web site
 Electric Boat information page on General Dynamics Corporation site 

Companies based in New London County, Connecticut
Defense companies of the United States
General Dynamics
John Philip Holland
Military in Connecticut
Shipbuilding companies of the United States
Submarine builders